The spotted dagger-tooth tree snake (Rhamnophis batesii) is a species of venomous snake in the family Colubridae. The species is indigenous to Middle Africa.

Etymology
The specific name, batesii, is in honor of American ornithologist George Latimer Bates.

Geographic range
R. batesii is found in Cameroon, Central African Republic, Congo, Democratic Republic of Congo, Equatorial Guinea, and Gabon.

Habitat

Description
The smooth dorsal scales are arranged in 13 rows at midbody, and the vertebral row is enlarged.

Behavior
R. batesii is arboreal.

Reproduction
R. batesii is oviparous.

Venom
R. batesii is a rear-fanged colubrid, i.e., it has venom, which it may be able to inoculate by biting. Because very little is known about this species and its venom, it is necessary to be very cautious when working with it. This species has an almost identical defence mechanism to the boomslang (Dispholidus typus) and twig snakes (genus Thelotornis) as they also inflate their throat to make themselves look bigger. It is believed that the species of the genus Rhamnophis evolved between the boomslang and the species of the genus Thrasops in terms of their fangs and means of envenomation.

References

Further reading
Boulenger GA (1908). "Descriptions of Three new Snakes from Africa". Annals and Magazine of Natural History, Eighth Series 2: 93–94. (Thrasops batesii, new species, p. 93).
Chippaux J-P, Jackson K (2019). Snakes of Central and Western Africa. Baltimore: Johns Hopkins University Press. 448 pp. . (Thrasops batesii, p. 371).
Schmidt KP (1923). "Contributions to the herpetology of the Belgian Congo based on the collection of the American Museum Congo Expedition, 1909–1915. Part II. Snakes, with field notes by Herbert Lang and James P. Chapin". Bulletin of the American Museum of Natural History 49 (1): 1–146. (Rhamnophis batesii, new combination, p. 83).

Colubrids
Snakes of Africa
Reptiles of Cameroon
Reptiles of the Central African Republic
Reptiles of the Democratic Republic of the Congo
Reptiles of Equatorial Guinea
Reptiles of Gabon
Reptiles of the Republic of the Congo
Taxa named by George Albert Boulenger
Reptiles described in 1908